The Frog Lake T-Birds are a Canadian junior B ice hockey team, based in Frog Lake, Alberta, Canada. They play in the North Eastern Alberta Junior B Hockey League, out of the New Horizons Arena. They are coached by Kelly Zacharias

History
The Frog Lake T-Birds were founded in 2014, entering the North Eastern Alberta Junior B Hockey League. They finished 7th overall in their debut season. The T-Birds had to forfeit the quarterfinal playoffs due to challenges in fielding enough players. They were  unable to return the following season.

Season-by-season record

See also
 List of ice hockey teams in Alberta

References

Ice hockey teams in Alberta
2014 establishments in Alberta